Marion Oaks is an unincorporated community and census-designated place (CDP) in Marion County, Florida, United States. It is part of the Ocala Metropolitan Statistical Area. As of the 2020 census, the population was 19,034. The community is currently exploring becoming an incorporated city.

Geography
The community is in southern Marion County, extending south to the Sumter County line. It is bordered to the east by Interstate 75, with access from Exit 341 (County Road 484).

Education

Compulsory education
Marion Oaks has three schools: Sunrise Elementary School (K-4), Marion Oaks Elementary (K-4), and Horizon Academy at Marion Oaks (5-8). Marion Oaks Elementary has an ESE wing.

The majority of Marion Oaks is zoned for Sunrise Elementary School, Horizon Academy and Dunnellon High School.  The Northern section of Marion Oaks is zoned for Marion Oaks Elementary and West Port High School.

College and vocational
College of Central Florida is a large community college which provides service to the entire Ocala metro area. CF offers multiple programs of study including bachelor's degrees and vocational training. Also on the campus is the University Center which houses satellites for state and private schools including University of Central Florida, Florida State University, University of Florida and St. Leo University.

Also serving the area is Marion Technical College.  MTC is a vocational training center in Ocala which provides technical training for various medical specialties and numerous other fields including welding, cybersecurity, cosmetology, and massage.

About Marion Oaks

Marion Oaks was developed by the Deltona Corporation more than thirty years ago. The real estate prices and taxes rose dramatically during the 2000s (far beyond the norm due to heavy investing and speculation); this happened only to fall back to more reasonable levels by the end of the decade. Deltona Corporation, the developer of Marion Oaks, has relocated their headquarters in the community. Currently, Deltona is building and selling newly developed single family homes in the Marion Oaks community at an increasingly fast rate due to affordability and quality construction. Marion Oaks has community areas, medical facilities, houses of worship, and a community center with a 450-seat auditorium, meeting rooms, a public library, and recreational facilities such as lighted multi-purpose sports courts.

Marion Oaks holds a spring celebration every year in April. The celebration includes a parade, health fair, book sale, talent show, car show, and many booths selling everything from homemade crafts to ethnic foods that are popular in the area.

Emergency services 
Marion Oaks public safety services are currently provided by Marion County.

Fire and rescue 
Marion Oaks has one fire station, which is located at the corner of Marion Oaks Lane and Marion Oaks Course. The fire station currently has 18 career firefighters.

Sheriff's office
Law enforcement for Marion Oaks is provided by the Marion County Sheriff's Office. A lieutenant, detective and eight patrol deputies are assigned to the area. The MCSO has a district office located in the Marion Oaks Community Center on Marion Oaks Lane at the intersection of Marion Oaks Boulevard.

References

Census-designated places in Marion County, Florida
Census-designated places in Florida
Unincorporated communities in Marion County, Florida
Unincorporated communities in Florida